Swoboda may refer to:

Swoboda (surname)

Places
Swoboda, Chodzież County, in Greater Poland Voivodeship (west-central Poland)
Swoboda, Gostynin County, in Masovian Voivodeship (east-central Poland)
Swoboda, Kalisz County, in Greater Poland Voivodeship (west-central Poland)
Swoboda, Lublin Voivodeship, in east Poland
Swoboda, Mińsk County, in Masovian Voivodeship (east-central Poland)
Swoboda, Wieruszów County, in Łódź Voivodeship (central Poland)
Swoboda, Zgierz County, in Łódź Voivodeship (central Poland)

See also
 
Svoboda (disambiguation)